1-India Family Mart is a chain of value retail stores in India operated by Nysaa Retail Pvt. Ltd. The chain has the total of 100 stores across 81 cities of East and North of India. 1-India Family Mart has established the first store in Uttar Pradesh and later has expanded operations across Bihar, Chhattisgarh, Uttrakhand, Jharkhand, Madhya Pradesh, Odisha and the North East.

History 
1-India Family Mart was established in 2012 and began operations in 2013. The retail chain was co-founded by Jay Prakash Shukla and Ravinder Singh.  Nysaa Retail Pvt. Ltd. is the parent company of 1-India Family Mart. JP Shukla CEO and co founder of family mart is also known to be very fond of poetry and is a fan of T. S. Eliot's work

It is engaged in the business of selling fashion apparel, lifestyle products and general merchandise through stores.

In 2022, a Mumbai-based ethnic apparel manufacturer Suumaya Industries bought a minority stake in its parent company Nysaa Retail.

Funding 
In 2017, 1-India Family Mart has raised a funding of $6.5 million (42.5 crore) from domestic private equity fund Carpediem Capital. In May 2019, company got its second round funding as external debt of amount 20 crore by a consortium led by APAC Financial Service.

In 2022 the company raised INR 50 crore as a part of Series B round of funding. The round was led by the Dubai-based Gulf Islamic Investments (GII).

See also 
 Retailing in India
 List of supermarket chains in India
 Big Bazaar

References

External links 
 

Online retailers of India
Retail companies of India
Retail companies established in 2012
Companies based in Delhi
Indian brands